Jyrki Nieminen (born 30 March 1951) is a retired Finnish footballer. Throughout his career he played for clubs in Finland and Sweden and also managed HJK Helsinki.

External links

1951 births
Living people
Finnish footballers
Association football midfielders
Veikkausliiga players
Allsvenskan players
Turun Palloseura footballers
Helsingin Jalkapalloklubi players
IFK Eskilstuna players
AIK Fotboll players
Helsingin Jalkapalloklubi managers
Finland international footballers
Finnish expatriate footballers
Finnish expatriate sportspeople in Sweden
Expatriate footballers in Sweden
Finnish football managers
Finland women's national football team managers
People from Salo, Finland
Sportspeople from Southwest Finland